Maksymilian Apolinary Hartglas (7 April 1883 – 7 March 1953) was a Zionist activist and one of the main political leaders of Polish Jews during the interwar period, a lawyer, a publicist, and a Sejm deputy from 1919 to 1930.

Biography
Maksymilian Apolinary Hartglas was born into a lawyer family from Podlasie. Between 1892 and 1900 he attended a secondary school in Biała Podlaska. Subsequently he earned a law degree from Warsaw University in 1904. Between 1907 and 1919 he practiced law in Siedlce with an additional office in Warsaw. While at the university he became involved with the Zionist movement and in 1906 he participated in a Zionist Helsingfors conference in Helsinki.

After the Nazi invasion of Poland and German occupation he was made a member of the Warsaw Judenrat.

In December 1939, he managed to escape to Trieste, Italy and immigrated to Palestine. He settled in Jerusalem. After the establishment of the State of Israel he served as a high ranking administrator in the Ministry of the Interior.

Political career
In 1919 he was elected by constituents of Biała Podlaska as a deputy to the first Sejm of the newly independent Polish state which was charged with writing a new constitution. In all he served three terms as a delegate. Before the elections of 1922 together with Yitzhak Gruenbaum he was a co-creator of Bloc of National Minorities, a parliamentary organization whose purpose was to represent ethnic minorities in the Polish parliament. One of his first acts as a deputy of the Sejm was to introduce a law which annulled all Russian sponsored laws which discriminated against Jews in the former Congress Poland.

In 1920 he took part in the Polish-Soviet War as a volunteer. Between 1938 and 1939 he was a member of the Warsaw City Council. During this time he published articles in "Głos Żydowski", "Tygodnik Żydowski" and "Życie Żydowskie" newspapers.

Published works
In 1996, his memoirs were published posthumously in Poland under the title At the border of two worlds (Polish: Na pograniczu dwóch światów), in which he described the social and political realities of Poland at the turn of the century, during World War I, and the interwar period. In the book he wrote:

See also
Ozjasz Thon

References

1883 births
1953 deaths
People from Biała Podlaska
People from Siedlce Governorate
Jews from the Russian Empire
Jewish Polish politicians
Polish Zionists
Members of the Legislative Sejm of the Second Polish Republic
Members of the Sejm of the Second Polish Republic (1922–1927)
Members of the Sejm of the Second Polish Republic (1928–1930)
Polish people of the Polish–Soviet War
Polish emigrants to Mandatory Palestine
Jews in Mandatory Palestine
Israeli people of Polish-Jewish descent